UGE International is a worldwide distributed solar energy company, founded in 2008, with headquarters in New York City and Toronto, and a local office in the Philippines. As of 2021, the company has installed 500MW of solar energy worldwide and completed more than 700 projects.

Services
The company develops, owns, and operates community and commercial solar & energy storage projects. Building owners, landowners, and institutional and commercial entities serve as site hosts for the solar projects. Residential and commercial off-takers subscribe to receive electricity from the solar projects. UGEngineering, a subsidiary of UGE International, provides engineering consulting services to clients in the United States and abroad.

Financial - TSX listing
In 2014 the company was publicly listed on the TSX Venture Exchange (TSX:UGE.V). The Haywood Securities initiated research coverage on the company in November 2017, setting a target share price of $1 and in June 2018, the SeeThru Equity initiated coverage with a price target of C$1.02 / $0.78.

Capitalization timeline
In August 2013, the company raises $20m fund from Tamra-Tacoma Capital Partners (now Energent L.P.) to provide financing for uge's fast-growing telecoms segment and secured $5M investment from Energine in April 2014. In March 2015, the company closed its non-brokered private placement of units (the "Units") at $1.50 per Unit for aggregate gross proceeds of CAD 1,784,751. The company acquire all of the issued and outstanding equity shares of Endura Energy Project Corp. In February 2016.

In 2017, UGE signed a $15 million contract with Peterborough Utilities that become one of the largest contracts in their history. The company also signed an agreement with a syndicate of underwriters the same year according to which the underwriters agreed to purchase three million units from the company at 60 cents per unit on a bought deal private placement basis for aggregate gross proceeds of $1.8-million.

References 

Engineering companies of the United States
Renewable energy companies of the United States
American companies established in 2008
Energy companies established in 2008
Renewable resource companies established in 2008
2008 establishments in New York (state)